On 15 March 2016, president-elect of the Republic of China Tsai Ing-wen named Lin Chuan premier. He was confirmed by the Legislative Yuan soon after and took office on 20 May 2016.

On 3 September 2017, Premier Lin Chuan tendered his resignation to President Tsai Ing-wen, which was reluctantly accepted. A recent poll showed Lin's approve rating to be a mere 28.7%, with 6 in 10 respondents dissatisfied with the performance of his cabinet.

Members of the Executive Yuan

Ministers
 Lin Hsi-yao, Vice Premier
 Yeh Jiunn-rong, Interior
 David Lee, Foreign Affairs
 Feng Shih-kuan, National Defense
 Sheu Yu-jer, Finance
 Pan Wen-chung, Education
 Chiu Tai-san, Justice
 Lee Chih-kung, Economic Affairs
 Hochen Tan, Transportation and Communications
 Lin Tzou-yien, Health and Welfare
 Cheng Li-chun, Culture
 Kuo Fang-yu, Labor
 Yang Hung-duen, Science and Technology

Ministers without portfolio
In the Lin cabinet, the following held office as ministers without portfolio:
 Audrey Tang
 Chang Ching-sen, also serving as Governor of Fujian Province
 Chen Tain-jy, also serving as Minister of National Development Council
 Hsu Jan-yau, also serving as Governor of Taiwan Province and Minister of Mongolian and Tibetan Affairs Commission
 John Deng
 Lin Wan-i
 Wu Hong-mo, also serving as Minister of Public Construction Commission
 Wu Tsung-tsong

Staff
 Chen Mei-ling, Secretary-General
 Ho Pei-shan and Sung Yu-hsieh, Deputy Secretaries-General

References

Executive Yuan